John D. Logeman was a major general in the United States Air Force.

Career
Logeman joined the Air Force in 1961. During the Vietnam War he served with the 555th Tactical Fighter Squadron. Commands he held later in his career include the 431st Tactical Fighter Squadron, the United States Air Force Fighter Weapons School, the 67th Tactical Reconnaissance Wing, the 28th Air Division, and was also given a command at Supreme Headquarters Allied Powers Europe. His retirement was effective as of June 1, 1995.

Awards he has received include the Silver Star, the Legion of Merit, the Distinguished Flying Cross with oak leaf cluster, the Meritorious Service Medal, the Air Medal with two silver oak leaf clusters and two bronze oak leaf clusters, the Air Force Commendation Medal, the Vietnam Service Medal with two service stars, and the Vietnamese Gallantry Cross.

Education
B.D., Business Administration – University of Wisconsin-Madison
Graduate – Squadron Officer School
Graduate – Armed Forces Staff College
Graduate – Industrial College of the Armed Forces

References

Living people
United States Air Force generals
Recipients of the Silver Star
Recipients of the Legion of Merit
Distinguished Flying Cross
Recipients of the Air Medal
Recipients of the Gallantry Cross (Vietnam)
United States Air Force personnel of the Vietnam War
Wisconsin School of Business alumni
Dwight D. Eisenhower School for National Security and Resource Strategy alumni
Year of birth missing (living people)